Bailleul (Belle in Dutch) is a commune in the Nord department in northern France.

Population

Heraldry

Media
Bailleul is the birthplace of French filmmaker Bruno Dumont and served as the setting for his first two feature films. This area is also a setting in the Timothy Findley book The Wars.

Carnival
The inhabitants of Bailleul celebrate carnival with five days of processions and other festivities.
The carnival has taken place since 1853, when the Philanthropic Company of Bailleul was founded. During the event, a search takes place for the needy ones of the city. The Gargantua Giant chairs the festivities, seated on his float and accompanied by his kitchen boys.

At the end of Shrove Tuesday, after the final procession of around 50 floats, with local groups, brass bands and plenty of confetti, Doctor Francisco Piccolissimo tries to cure the excesses of some inhabitants in an unconventional way in front of the town hall, and the festival continues late into the night in the town's cafés and bars.

Points of interest
The city hall and belfry of Bailleul was inscribed on the UNESCO World Heritage List in 2005 as part of the Belfries of Belgium and France site, in recognition of their importance in the rise of municipal power in Europe.

The Jardin des Plantes Sauvages du Conservatoire botanique national de Bailleul is a botanical garden of protected plants. Over 850 species of native plants are found in the garden.

History 
In 1526, Flanders fell to the Spanish Netherlands by the Treaty of Madrid. Under the reign of Philip II, the first religious problems arose between Flanders and Spain.

In the 17th century, Flanders was a permanent battlefield. Louis XIV reconquered Flanders. As a result, Bailleul reverted to France in 1678.

With the Treaty of Utrecht, Flanders and with it Bailleul fell to Austria in 1713, before both finally passed to France in 1745 after the Battle of Fontenoy and the Treaty of Aachen. Numerous fires marked the history of the city.

From the 17th to the 19th century, the bobbin lace craft developed in Bailleul. (La Maison de la Dentelle bobbin lace museum), a craft for which the town is still known far beyond its borders.

During First World War, the area around Bailleul was at times heavily affected by the heavy fighting that German and Allied troops engaged in around the nearby Belgian town of Ypres. When German troops used chlorine gas against the Allied troops near Wulverghem (municipality of Heuvelland, Belgium) on 30 April 1916 over a front length of 3.2 kilometres, the resulting toxic gas cloud extended as far as Bailleul. During the German Spring Offensive in Operation Georgette from 13 April 1918, Bailleul with its old Flemish Town Centre was more than 90 percent destroyed.
After the severe destruction of the First World War, the town was rebuilt in the Neo-Flemish style during the 20th century. A typical example of the architectural style, which was widespread throughout Flanders, is the town hall of 1932 with its bell tower.

Railways

Bailleul has a railway station on the line from Lille to Calais and Dunkirk.

International relations

Bailleul is twinned with:
 Werne, Germany, since 1967
 Hawick, Scotland, United Kingdom, since 1973
 Izegem, Belgium, since 1992
 Kyritz, Germany, since 2012
 Wałcz, Poland, since 2015

Personalities
 Edmond de Coussemaker
 Pharaon de Winter, painter
 Marguerite Yourcenar, academic
 Jean Delobel, politician
 Michel Delebarre, politician
 Bruno Dumont, director and filmmaker
 Philippe Édouard Léon Van Tieghem, Biologist and botanist born in Bailleul in 1839
 Jean-Luc Samyn, jockey in American thoroughbred racing

See also
Communes of the Nord department
French Flanders

References

External links
 Official website

Communes of Nord (French department)
French Flanders